Baby Darling Doll Face Honey is the debut album by Southampton  rock band Band of Skulls.  It was released on 7 April 2009 in England and 28 July 2009 in America.  The artwork is based on paintings by bass player/vocalist Emma Richardson.

Baby Darling Doll Face Honey was produced, recorded and mixed by Ian Davenport, (Supergrass, Badly Drawn Boy), and recorded at Courtyard Studios in Oxfordshire and mixed at the House of Blues studio in Los Angeles.

The first single "I Know What I Am" was released as the single of the week in Canada. The album's first track "Light of the Morning", was featured in a television ad for the 2011 Ford Mustang.

The song "I Know What I Am" features in the music game Guitar Hero: Warriors of Rock and as a downloadable track for Rock Band through the Rock Band Network, while the song "Patterns" features in the driving simulator Gran Turismo 5.

The album debuted belatedly on the UK Indie Chart on 27 February 2010 at position 50.

Reception

Critical reception to Baby Darling Doll Face Honey was generally positive. In the UK Classic Rock gave the album a 9 out of 10 review, stating that "the entire collection crackles with an urgency and authenticity that's as rare as it is desirable." The website PopMatters gave the album a 6 out of 10, stating that the album was "a mish-mash of three or four styles, recalling as many different artists, with songs written by all three band members and sung by two of them. If that sentence was dizzying to read, imagining hearing the album. It’s as if every cast member of Friends got to write and direct a different scene in a single episode. It’s as if every third letter on this page were a different color. It’s just, shall we say, a bit jarring."  They go on to refer to the song, "Impossible" as a mix of U2, Coldplay and Clap Your Hands Say Yeah.

Track listing

Personnel
Russell Marsden – vocals, guitar
Emma Richardson – vocals, bass guitar
Matt Hayward – drums

Charts

References

2009 debut albums
Band of Skulls albums